The Young Scientist Award is a Korean award for young scientists under the age of 40 with research and development achievements in the natural sciences and engineering fields. Four recipients are selected on an annual basis. While the award is organized by the Korean Academy of Science and Technology, it is given on behalf of the president of Korea and comes with prize money of initially KRW 30 million and later KRW 50 million. Candidates for the award must be Korean or working within Korea at a university or research institute. The award is presented to natural science researchers in even-numbered years and engineering in odd-numbered years. 

Awards are given in four categories. Within natural science these categories are mathematics, physics, chemistry, and life science, accordingly. Within engineering, category 1 is electricity, electronics, computers, and information and communications technology; category 2 is machinery, metals, ceramics, aviation, shipbuilding, industrial engineering, and electronic materials; category 3 is chemical engineering, food, polymers, textiles, biotechnology, and industrial chemistry; and category 4 is energy, architecture, civil engineering, environment, resources, and urban engineering.

Many of the winners were affiliated with SKY, KAIST, or POSTECH at the time of the award and later frequently work for KAIST or the Institute for Basic Science.

Recipients

References

External links
 Korean Academy of Science and Technology

South Korean awards
Awards established in 1997
1997 establishments in South Korea